Tudor Hall is a historic home located at Leonardtown, St. Mary's County, Maryland.  It is a large, rectangular, -story, Georgian brick building built about 1798. It is one of the oldest buildings in Leonardtown, which was created by the Maryland Legislature in 1720. It is home to the St. Mary's County Historical Society.

It was listed on the National Register of Historic Places in 1973.

References

External links
Tudor Hall - St. Mary's County Historical Society
, including photo from 1997, at Maryland Historical Trust

Historic Preservation Commission - Tudor Hall

Houses on the National Register of Historic Places in Maryland
Houses completed in 1798
Georgian architecture in Maryland
Leonardtown, Maryland
Museums in St. Mary's County, Maryland
Historic house museums in Maryland
Houses in St. Mary's County, Maryland
Historic American Buildings Survey in Maryland
National Register of Historic Places in St. Mary's County, Maryland
1798 establishments in Maryland